Rajya Sabha elections were held throughout 2021, to elect new members to fill vacancies in the Rajya Sabha, the Indian Parliament's upper chamber. Members sit for staggered terms lasting six years, with elections every year but almost a third of the 233 designates up for election every two years.

Elections to the 4 vacant seats from Jammu and Kashmir were not held in February as the union territory is under President's rule and the assembly has been dissolved.

Elections

Results

Members retiring & Elected

Jammu And Kashmir

Kerala

Puducherry

By-elections
Aside from automatic elections, unforeseen vacancies caused by members' resignation, death or disqualification, are unless a few months before the expected natural expiry of the term of tenure, filled via by-elections, which for the Rajya Sabha often take some months to organise.

Assam 

 On 21 November 2020 Biswajit Daimary resigned.
Biswajit Daimary Elected As MLA.

Gujarat 

 On 25 November 2020 Ahmed Patel died.
 On 1 December 2020 Abhay Bharadwaj died.

Kerala 

 On 9 January 2021 Jose K. Mani resigned.

West Bengal 

 On 12 February 2021, Dinesh Trivedi resigned.
Manas Bhunia Elected As MLA.
 On 15 September 2021, Arpita Ghosh resigned.

Tamil Nadu 

 On 24 March 2021, A. Mohammedjan died.
On 10 May 2021, K. P. Munusamy Resigned Due To Election As MLA.
On 10 May 2021, R. Vaithilingam Resigned Due To Election As MLA.

Maharashtra 

 On 16 May 2021, Rajeev Satav died.

Madhya Pradesh 

 On 7 July 2021, Thawar Chand Gehlot resigned due to his appointment as Governor of Karnataka.

Nominations

Nominated members 

 On 16 March 2021, Swapan Dasgupta resigned.
 On 9 May 2021, Raghunath Mohapatra died

See also 
List of current members of the Rajya Sabha
Member of the Legislative Assembly (India)
List of members of the 17th Lok Sabha
2021 elections in India 
2022 Punjab Legislative Assembly election
2021 Legislative Council elections

Notes

References

2021 elections in India
2021